David Colbreth Broderick (February 4, 1820 – September 16, 1859) was an attorney and politician, elected by the legislature as Democratic U.S. Senator from California. Born in Washington, DC, to Irish immigrant parents, he lived in New York until moving to California during the Gold Rush. He was a first cousin of politicians Andrew Kennedy of Indiana and Case Broderick of Kansas.

Early years
Broderick was born in 1820 in Washington, D.C., on East Capitol Street just west of 3rd Street. He was the son of an Irish stonecutter and his wife. His father had come to the United States in order to work on the United States Capitol. In 1823 Broderick moved with his parents to New York City. There he attended public schools and was apprenticed to a stonecutter.

Political career
Broderick became active in politics as a young man, joining the Democratic Party. In 1846, he was the Democratic candidate for U.S. Representative from New York's 5th congressional district, but lost the election to Whig candidate Frederick A. Tallmadge, who gained 42% of the vote to Broderick's 38%.

Mining career
In 1849, Broderick joined the California Gold Rush. He moved to San Francisco, where he engaged in smelting and assaying gold. Broderick minted gold coins that contained less gold than their face value, keeping the difference. His $10 coins, for example, contained $8 in gold. He used the profits to finance his political aspirations.

State Senate career
Broderick was a member of the California State Senate from 1850 to 1852, serving as its president from 1851 to 1852.  Broderick was acting Lieutenant Governor from January 9, 1851 to January 8, 1852, following incumbent John McDougall's succession to the governorship.  From then on, Broderick effectively had political control of San Francisco, which under his "utterly vicious" rule soon became notorious for municipal corruption.  In the words of his biographer Jeremiah Lynch:

Broderick became rich from this system.

In 1856 Broderick was elected by the state legislature as US Senator from California. (Popular election of senators did not start until the 20th century.) Broderick began his term on March 4, 1857.

Feud and death

At that time, just prior to the start of the American Civil War, the Democratic Party of California was divided between pro-slavery and "Free Soil" factions. Broderick led the Free Soilers. One of his closest friends was David S. Terry, formerly the Chief Justice of the California State Supreme Court. He advocated extending slavery into California. Terry lost his re-election bid because of his pro-slavery platform, and he blamed Broderick for the loss.

Terry, considered even by his friends as caustic and aggressive, made some inflammatory remarks at a party convention in Sacramento, which Broderick read. He took offense, and sent Terry an equally vitriolic reply, describing:

Terry to be a "damned miserable wretch" who was as corrupt as President James Buchanan and William Gwin, California's other senator. "I have hitherto spoken of him as an honest man—as the only honest man on the bench of a miserable, corrupt Supreme Court—but now I find I was mistaken. I take it all back. He is just as bad as the others."

Passions escalated; on September 13, 1859, former friends Terry and Broderick, both expert marksmen, met outside of San Francisco city limits at Lake Merced for a duel. The pistols chosen for the duel had hair triggers, and Broderick's discharged prior to the final "1-2-3" count, firing prematurely into the ground.  Thus disarmed, he was forced to stand as Terry shot him in the right lung.  Terry at first believed the shot to be only a flesh wound, but it proved to be fatal. Broderick died three days later, and was buried under a monument erected by the state in Lone Mountain Cemetery in San Francisco. In 1942 he was reinterred at Cypress Lawn Memorial Park in Colma.

Legacy
Edward Dickinson Baker, a close friend of Abraham Lincoln, spoke at Broderick's funeral. He expressed the widely held belief that Broderick was killed because of his anti-slavery stance:

His death was a political necessity, poorly veiled beneath the guise of a private quarrel. . .What was his public crime? The answer is in his own words; "I die because I was opposed to a corrupt administration and the extension of slavery."

Some maintain that in his death Broderick became a martyr to the anti-slavery cause, and the episode was part of a national spiral towards civil war. At the Republican National Convention in Chicago in May 1860, a portrait of the late Senator Broderick was hung.

About thirty years later, Terry was shot to death by Deputy United States Marshal David Neagle while threatening Supreme Court Justice Stephen Johnson Field, a friend of Broderick.
 
Broderick County, Kansas Territory was named for the senator. The former town of Broderick, California, and Broderick Street in San Francisco were also named in his honor.

In 1963, Carroll O'Connor was cast as Broderick, with Brad Dexter as Justice Terry, in "A Gun Is Not a Gentleman" on the syndicated television anthology series, Death Valley Days, hosted by Stanley Andrews. The program portrays Terry mortally wounding Senator Broderick in 1859. Though past allies as Democrats, Terry, a defender of slavery, challenges the anti-slavery Broderick to a duel. After he fatally shoots Broderick, Terry is tried, but the case is dismissed.

See also
List of United States Congress members killed or wounded in office
List of United States Congress members who died in office (1790–1899)

References

Further reading
 Retrieved on 2008-01-14
 Arthur Quinn, The Rivals: William Gwin, David Broderick, and the Birth of California, (Crown Publishers, Inc.: The Library of the American West, New York, 1994), 

External links
 
 Obituary for Broderick in California Police Gazette

|-

1820 births
1859 deaths
19th-century American politicians
19th-century American lawyers
American abolitionists
American people of Irish descent
American politicians killed in duels
Burials at Cypress Lawn Memorial Park
Burials at Laurel Hill Cemetery (San Francisco)
Democratic Party California state senators
Daly City, California
Deaths by firearm in California
Democratic Party United States senators from California
Lawyers from New York City
Lieutenant Governors of California
New York (state) Democrats
People from Washington, D.C.
People of the California Gold Rush
Politicians from New York City